Vashian-e Nasir Tappeh (also Romanized as Vāshīān-e Naşīr Tappeh; also known as Tappeh Vāshīān, Vāsheyān, Vāshyān, and Wāshiyan) is a village in Miyankuh-e Gharbi Rural District, in the Central District of Pol-e Dokhtar County, Lorestan Province, Iran. At the 2006 census, its population was 378, in 83 families.

References 

Towns and villages in Pol-e Dokhtar County